Therapeutic Target Database (TTD) is a pharmaceutical and medical repository constructed by the Innovative Drug Research and Bioinformatics Group (IDRB) at Zhejiang University, China and the Bioinformatics and Drug Design Group at the National University of Singapore. It provides information about known and explored therapeutic protein and nucleic acid targets, the targeted disease, pathway information and the corresponding drugs directed at each of these targets. Detail knowledge about target function, sequence, 3D structure, ligand binding properties, enzyme nomenclature and drug structure, therapeutic class, and clinical development status. TTD is freely accessible without any login requirement.

Statistics 
This database currently contains 3,419 therapeutic targets (461 successful, 1,191 clinical trial, 207 patented and 1,560 research targets) and 37,316 drugs (2,649 approved, 9,465 clinical trial, 5,059 patented and 20,143 experimental drugs). The targets and drugs in TTD cover 583 protein biochemical classes and 958 drug therapeutic classes, respectively. The latest version of the International Classification of Diseases (ICD-11) codes released by WHO are incorporated in TTD to facilitate the clear definition of disease/disease class.

Validation of Primary Therapeutic Target 
Target validation normally requires the determination that the target is expressed in the disease-relevant cells/tissues, it can be directly modulated by a drug or drug-like molecule with adequate potency in biochemical assay, and that target modulation in cell and/or animal models ameliorates the relevant disease phenotype. Therefore, TTD collects three types of target validation data:

 Experimentally determined potency of drugs against their primary target or targets.
 Evident potency or effects of drugs against disease models (cell-lines, ex-vivo, in-vivo models) linked to their primary target or targets.
 Observed effects of target knockout, knockdown, RNA interference, transgenetic, antibody or antisense treated in-vivo models.

Mutation and Expression Profile of Target 
Extensive efforts have been directed at the discovery, investigation and clinical monitoring of targeted therapeutics. These efforts may be facilitated by the convenient access of the genetic, proteomic, interactive and other aspects of the therapeutic targets. The related data are provided in TTD:

 2,000 drug resistance mutations in 83 targets and 104 target/drug regulatory genes.
 Differential expression profiles of 758 targets in the disease-relevant drug-targeted tissue and the non-targeted tissues.
 1,008 target combinations of 1,764 drugs and the 1,604 target combinations of 664 multi-target drugs.

Clinical Trial and Patent Protected Target 
Increasing numbers of proteins, nucleic acids and other molecular entities have been explored as therapeutic targets, hundreds of which are targets of approved, clinical trial and patent protected drugs. Knowledge of these targets and corresponding drugs, particularly those in clinical uses, trials and patented, is highly useful for facilitating drug discovery. The latest version of TTD provided:

 Clinical trial agents and their targets together with their structures and experimental activity values.
 Patented agents and their targets together with their structures and experimental activity values.

Regulator and Signaling Pathway of Target 
Knowledge of therapeutic targets and early drug candidates is useful for improved drug discovery. Particularly, the data of target regulators and affiliated signaling pathways can facilitate the researches regarding druggability, systems pharmacology, new trends, molecular landscapes, and the development of drug discovery tools. Some transporters database are provided TTD is thus developed to provide such information about:

 Target-regulating microRNAs & transcription factors and target-interacting proteins.
 Comprehensive target-pathway pairs fully referenced by multiple pathway databases.
 The convenient access of the multiple targets and drugs cross-linked to each of these pathway entries.

References

External links
 Therapeutic Target Database home page
 Article on PubMed
 Innovative Drug Research and Bioinformatics Group

Proteins
Pharmacology literature
Chemical databases
Medical databases
Drugs in Singapore

de:Target (Biologie)
sl:Biološka tarča